Ryan Sullivan (born 1983) is an American painter.

Biography 
Sullivan attended the Rhode Island School of Design (RISD) and graduated in 2005. Sullivan worked as a painting assistant to Ross Bleckner and Laura Owens.

His first solo exhibition was in 2015 at the Institute of Contemporary Art, Miami. Sullivan has exhibited at various museums and galleries worldwide, including The High Line, MoMA PS1; Kunstmuseum Bonn; Hydra Workshop, Greece, Flag Art Foundation, New York; Sadie Coles HQ, London; Maccarone, New York; Rubell Family Foundation, Miami; White Flag Projects, Saint Louis; and Palazzo delle Esposizioni, Rome.

In 2013, he was artist-in-residence at Chinati Foundation, Marfa, Texas and the Robert Rauschenberg Foundation, Captiva, Florida.

Collections 

 Museum of Modern Art, New York City, New York
 Los Angeles County Museum of Art, Los Angeles, California
 Hammer Museum, Los Angeles, California
 San Francisco Museum of Modern Art, San Francisco, California
 Institute of Contemporary Art, Miami, Miami, Florida
 Rhode Island School of Design Museum, Providence, Rhode Island
 Rubell Collection, Miami, Florida

References 

1983 births
21st-century American painters
21st-century American male artists
Abstract painters
American abstract artists
American male painters
Living people
Painters from New York (state)
Rhode Island School of Design alumni